Santo is an unincorporated community in Palo Pinto County, Texas, United States. It lies on Farm to Market Road 4, 14 miles south of Palo Pinto, and has an estimated population of 315.

Education
The Santo Independent School District serves area students.

References

Unincorporated communities in Texas
Unincorporated communities in Palo Pinto County, Texas